The Ornans meteorite is a carbonaceous chondrite and the type specimen of the CO group (Carbonaceous Ornans group). Its fall was observed in France in 1868.

References

Meteorites found in France